Chad Gerlach (born July 13, 1973) is an American former professional road cyclist.

He gained notoriety for his comeback to professional cycling in 2009 after suffering from addiction for approximately five years.

Major results
1996
 1st Nevada City Classic
 1st Stage 1 Course de la Solidarité Olympique
 1st Stage 7 Tour of China
 1st Stage 4 Killington Stage Race
 7th Binche–Tournai–Binche
1997
 3rd Nevada City Classic
1998
 1st Stages 7 & 10 Tour de Langkawi
2009
 5th Nevada City Classic

References

External links
 

1973 births
Living people
American male cyclists
Sportspeople from Sacramento, California